"I Don't Have Far to Fall" is a song co-written and recorded by American country music artist Skip Ewing. It was released in August 1988 as the second single from the album The Coast of Colorado.  The song reached number 8 on the Billboard Hot Country Singles & Tracks chart.  Ewing wrote the song with Don Sampson.

Music video
The music video was directed by Jim May and premiered in mid-1988.

Charts

Weekly charts

Year-end charts

References

1988 singles
1988 songs
Skip Ewing songs
Songs written by Skip Ewing
Song recordings produced by Jimmy Bowen
MCA Records singles
Songs written by Don Sampson